Clínicas is a station on Line 2 (Green) of the São Paulo Metro. The station is connected to the main complex of the Hospital das Clínicas.

Station layout

References

São Paulo Metro stations
Railway stations opened in 1992
Railway stations located underground in Brazil